In the U.S. state of New York, county routes exist in all 62 counties except those in the five boroughs of New York City. Most are maintained locally by county highway departments. County route designations are assigned at the county level; as a result, routes often change numbers as they cross from one county to the next due to the lack of a statewide numbering system and lack of coordination between counties. Some exceptions exist, such as County Route 36 (CR 36) in Ontario County and CR 36A in Livingston County. The assignment of routes by individual counties also results in varying system density and numbering and signage practices between the state's counties.

Numbering and layout
The exact method of county route numbering varies by county. Some counties, such as Dutchess County, use a system in which county route numbers are assigned by town in alphabetical order while others like Monroe County assign numbers in a general west-to-east fashion. Still others, for instance Livingston County, have no defined pattern. The highest-numbered posted county route and the only four-digit county route signed as such in the state, CR 1345, resides in Saratoga County.

Like the numbering system and the choice of signage, the complexity of the county highway system varies by county as well. Erie County, for example, one of the most urbanized counties in Upstate New York, maintains a system of nearly 400 routes. In contrast, the Southern Tier county of Tioga manages only 29 roads.

Signage
The method that each county employs to sign its routes varies from one county to the next. The majority of counties in New York use the MUTCD-standard blue pentagonal shield with yellow lettering. Others tweak this shield slightly, using white lettering instead of yellow (particularly in areas near the Capital District) or using shapes similar to a pentagon. Additionally, Orange County employs a wide assortment of signage, ranging from the standard blue pentagonal shield to a blue diamond with white lettering. On the other hand, some counties, such as Orleans and Westchester counties, do not post signage along their routes. Most of New York switched to the MUTCD-standard blue pentagon shield ca. 1974. Signs that predate this transition can still be found in certain areas of the state.

List of county routes by county

References

External links
County Highways in New York State
New York County Road Sign Gallery